Antennarius indicus, known as the Indian frogfish, is a species of fish in the family Antennariidae that is native to the western Indian Ocean, from East Africa to the Gulf of Oman in the west and Sri Lanka and India in the east, including the Seychelles. It is known to occur to a depth of at least 25 m (82 ft), and it is reportedly an uncommon species. The Indian frogfish reaches 23 cm (9 inches) in total length.

References 

Antennariidae
Fish of the Indian Ocean
Fish described in 1964